Christopher Horner may refer to:

Christopher Horner (director) (born 1955)
Christopher C. Horner, American attorney and author
Chris Horner (born 1971), American bicycle racer

See also
Christian Horner (born 1973), British Formula 1 manager